Carex microptera is a species of sedge known by the common name smallwing sedge. It is native to western North America, including most all of western Canada and the western United States. It occurs in moist mountain habitat such as meadows and riverbanks. This sedge produces dense clumps of erect stems over 20 centimeters tall and up to about a meter in height. The inflorescence is a dense cluster of green or brown spikes packed tightly and indistinct from each other.

External links
Jepson Manual Treatment
USDA Plants Profile
Flora of North America
Photo gallery

microptera
Plants described in 1909